The women's heptathlon event at the 2003 Summer Universiade was held in Daegu, South Korea.

Results

References
Results

Athletics at the 2003 Summer Universiade
2003 in women's athletics
2003